David Laws (birth unknown) is a former rugby union, and professional rugby league footballer who played in the 1980s.

Playing career

Great Britain International - 1986

Yorkshire Cap - 1985

Rugby League Championship Winner - 1983/84

Rugby League Championship Winner - 1984/85

Rugby League Premiership Winner - 1983/84

JPS Trophy Winner - 1984/85

Yorkshire Cup Winner - 1985/86

Challenge Cup R/Up - 1985/86

Rugby League Premiership R/Up - 1984/85

JPS Trophy R/Up -1985/86

Yorkshire Cup R/Up - 1984/85

International honours
David Laws won a cap for Great Britain (RL) while at Hull Kingston Rovers in 1986 against France.

County Honours

David Laws played , i.e. number 5, for Yorkshire v Lancashire in their 26-10 victory in the 1985 'War Of The Roses' Fixture.

Challenge Cup Final appearances
David Laws played , i.e. number 5, in Hull Kingston Rovers' 14–15 defeat by Castleford in the 1984 Challenge Cup Final during the 1984–85 season at Wembley Stadium, London, on Saturday 3 May 1986, in front of a crowd of 82,134.

County Cup Final appearances
David Laws played , i.e. number 5, in Hull Kingston Rovers' 10–29 defeat by Hull F.C. in the 1984 Yorkshire County Cup Final during the 1984–85 season at Boothferry Park, Kingston upon Hull, on Saturday 27 October 1984, and played  in the 22–18 victory over Castleford in the 1984 Yorkshire County Cup Final during the 1984–85 season at Headingley Rugby Stadium, Leeds, on Sunday 27 October 1985.

John Player Special Trophy Final appearances
David Laws played , i.e. number 5, in Hull Kingston Rovers' 12-0 victory over Hull F.C. in the 1984–85 John Player Special Trophy Final during the 1984–85 season at Boothferry Park, Kingston upon Hull on Saturday 26 January 1985, and played , and scored a try in the 8-11 defeat by Wigan in the 1985–86 John Player Special Trophy Final during the 1985–86 season at Elland Road, Leeds on Saturday 11 January 1986.

Rugby League Premiership Final Appearances

David Lawsplayed , i.e. number 5 and scored a try  in Hull Kingston Rovers' 18-10 victory over Castleford Tigers in the Final of the 1983-84 Rugby League Premiership during the 1983–84 season

David Laws played , i.e. number 5 and scored a try in Hull Kingston Rovers' 36-16 defeat against St.Helens in the Final of the 1984-85 Rugby League Premiership during the 1984-85 season

1983 Queensland Tour

David Laws played  number 14 in Hull Kingston Rovers' 8-6 victory over Queensland as they toured Papua New Guinea and England during the 1983–84 Rugby Football League season

References

External links
!Great Britain Statistics at englandrl.co.uk (statistics currently missing due to not having appeared for both Great Britain, and England)

Living people
English rugby league players
English rugby union players
Great Britain national rugby league team players
Hull Kingston Rovers players
Place of birth missing (living people)
Rugby league wingers
Year of birth missing (living people)
Yorkshire rugby league team players